Brooks, Michigan may refer to:

 Brooks, Bay County, Michigan
 Brooks, Newaygo County, Michigan